The Japanese boy band Kanjani Eight is a pop idol group managed by Johnny & Associates and works released by Infinity Records. The group, currently, has a total of 36 released singles, 9 studio albums, one mini album, and fifteen DVD releases. Thirty three of thirty six singles have placed at number-one on the Oricon singles chart. 47, the concert DVD for their 2007 nationwide tour, was the top selling music DVD of 2008.

Albums

Studio album

Mini album

Compilations

Singles

Videos

Concert

References

Discography
Discographies of Japanese artists